James Logue (born 1989) is an Irish hurler who previously lined out with the Tipperary and Kerry senior teams.

Born in Ballingarry, County Tipperary, Logue first played competitive hurling during his schooling at Presentation Secondary School Ballingarry. He arrived on the inter-county scene at the age of seventeen when he first linked up with the Tipperary minor team, before later joining the under-21 and intermediate sides. Logue was ever present in the goal on these tipperary teams as all three teams gained all ireland and munster success. He joined the senior panel during the 2014 championship. Logue remained as third-choice goalkeeper for the season. In December 2014 he joined the Kerry senior team for one season citing work commitments as the reason for this. he was part of the Kerry team that won the division 2a Hurling league and christy ring this season. At club level Logue remains ever present in goal for ballingarry since 2006. He has won many divisional south championships underage all in the forwards.

At club level Logue plays with Ballingarry.

Honours

Player

Tipperary, Ballingarry, Lit 
All-Ireland Intermediate Hurling Championship (1): 2012
Munster Intermediate Hurling Championship (1): 2012
All-Ireland Under-21 Hurling Championship (1): 2010
Munster Under-21 Hurling Championship (1): 2010
All-Ireland Minor Hurling Championship (1): 2007 Munster Minor Hurling Championship (1): 2007
South Tipperary Minor "a" hurling championship 2006, 2007
South Tipperary U21 "A" Hurling championship 2010
Ryan cup All ireland colleges 2013
Fergal Maher all ireland colleges 2012
Colleges All ireland senior hurling league division 2 championship 2012

References

1989 births
Living people
Hurling goalkeepers
Ballingarry hurlers
Tipperary inter-county hurlers
Kerry inter-county hurlers